Septobasidium polygoni is a plant pathogenic fungus in the genus Septobasidium. It was first isolated from Koenigia campanulata.

References

External links

MycoBank

Fungal plant pathogens and diseases
Teliomycotina